Milan Beara is a politician in Serbia. He has served in the Assembly of Vojvodina since 2020 as a member of the Serbian Progressive Party.

Private career
Beara lives in Stara Pazova. He is an entrepreneur.

Politician

Municipal politics
Beara received the thirty-first position on the Progressive Party's electoral list for the Stara Pazova municipal assembly in the 2016 Serbian local elections and narrowly missed direct election when the list won twenty-nine mandates. He may have briefly served in the assembly at the start of the term as the replacement for another member. Beara was appointed as the municipality's deputy mayor on 18 May 2016 and served in this role for the next four years.

He was given the sixth position on the Progressive Party's list for Stara Pazova in the 2020 local elections and was elected when the list won a majority with thirty-seven of fifty-three mandates. He resigned his mandate on 21 August 2020.

Provincial politics
Beara sought election to the Vojvodina provincial assembly in the 2012 provincial election, running in the Stara Pazova constituency seat. He was narrowly defeated in the second round of voting. 

Vojvodina subsequently switched to a system of complete proportional representation. Beara was given the nineteenth position on the Progressive Party's list in the 2020 provincial election and was elected when the list won a majority victory with seventy-six out of 120 seats. He is now the deputy president of the assembly committee on the economy and a member of the committee on organization of administration and local self-government.

Electoral Record

Provincial (Vojvodina)

References

1980 births
Living people
People from Stara Pazova
Members of the Assembly of Vojvodina
Serbian Progressive Party politicians